League tables for teams participating in Ykkönen, the second tier of the Finnish Soccer League system, in 2002.

League tables

Preliminary Stage, Southern Zone

HIK Hanko and Jokrut Helsinki withdrew

Top two to promotion/relegation group, the rest to Division One Relegation Group.

Preliminary Stage, Northern Zone

TPV Tampere withdrew; their divisional place was inherited by GBK Kokkola, the best non-promoted runner-up of the Division Two regional groups previous season. PP-70 Tampere

were moved to the Southern Zone.

Top two to promotion/relegation group, the rest to Division One Relegation Group.

Promotion/relegation group

Top six to Premier Division 2003, the rest to Division One 2003.

Note: The teams obtained bonus points on the basis of their preliminary stage position.

Relegation Group, Southern Zone

Relegation Group, Northern Zone

Promotion/relegation playoffs

FC Espoo – HIFK Helsinki 3–3
HIFK Helsinki – FC Espoo, 2–2
WJK Varkaus* – Viikingit Helsinki 0–3
Viikingit Helsinki – WJK Varkaus 3–2
TPV Tampere – Kraft Närpiö 0–2
Kraft, Närpiö – TPV, Tampere 4–0
OLS Oulu – FC Korsholm Mustasaari 1–2
FC Korsholm Mustasaari – OLS Oulu 0–6

NB: * formerly WP-35 Varkaus, who merged with VarTP Varkaus

OLS Oulu promoted, Korsholm Mustasaari relegated. HIFK Helsinki, Viikingit Helsinki and Kraft Närpiö remained in Division One.

No teams directly promoted from Division Two.

Leading goal-scorers

17 - Janne Kauria - FC Honka
11 - Jarno Auremaa - TPS
11 - Niclas Grönholm - RoPS
11 - Mikko Hyyrynen - TPS
11 - Mikko Mäkelä - PP-70
11 - Marko Rajamäki - TPS
10 - Matti Heimo - VG-62
10 - Juho Mäkelä - Tervarit
10 - Timo Peltola - GBK
10 - Zeddy Saileti - RoPS
10 - Sead Ustic - Kraft

References

Ykkönen seasons
2002 in Finnish football
Fin
Fin